María del Pilar León-Castro Alonso (born 13 September 1946, in Seville) is a Spanish archaeologist and historian, as well as an academician of the Real Academia de la Historia.

In 1969, León-Castro Alonso graduated in arts from the University of Seville with honors and received her doctorate there in 1974. She studied under Antonio Blanco Freijeiro, and extended her studies in Bonn by a grant from the Alexander von Humboldt Foundation. She also spent two years conducting research at the Institute of Archaeology Rodrigo Caro Spanish National Research Council. Her research has included Roman Córdoba. Previously a professor at the Complutense University of Madrid, the University of Santiago de Compostela, the University of Cordoba, and the University Pablo de Olavide, she is currently a professor of archeology at the University of Seville.

León-Castro Alonso founded the magazine Romula which focuses on the archeology of Roman ruins in the Iberian Peninsula. She is a member of the German Archaeological Institute and an academic of the  Real Academia de Bellas Artes de Santa Isabel de Hungría. León-Castro Alonso was elected to medalla nº 9 of the Real Academia de la Historia on 13 April 2012; she took up her seat on 19 May 2013.

References

1946 births
Living people
People from Seville
20th-century Spanish archaeologists
21st-century Spanish archaeologists
Spanish women historians
Spanish women archaeologists
University of Seville alumni
Academic staff of the Complutense University of Madrid
Academic staff of the University of Santiago de Compostela
Academic staff of the University of Córdoba (Spain)
Academic staff of the University of Seville
Members of the Real Academia de la Historia
20th-century women writers